Ornithoglossum is a genus of plants native to southern Africa, some of which are widely cultivated as ornamentals. Nine species are currently recognized, as of April 2014:

Ornithoglossum calcicola K.Krause & Dinter - Namibia
Ornithoglossum dinteri K.Krause - Namibia, South Africa
Ornithoglossum gracile B.Nord. - Cape Province
Ornithoglossum parviflorum B.Nord. - Namibia, Cape Province
Ornithoglossum pulchrum Snijman, B.Nord. & Mannh. - Namibia
Ornithoglossum undulatum Sweet - Namibia, Cape Province
Ornithoglossum viride (L.f.) Dryand. ex W.T.Aiton - Cape Province
Ornithoglossum vulgare B.Nord. - Tanzania, Malawi, Mozambique, Zambia, Zimbabwe, Botswana, Namibia, South Africa 
Ornithoglossum zeyheri (Baker) B.Nord. - Cape Province

References

External links

Colchicaceae
Colchicaceae genera